The PMD 85 is an 8-bit personal computer produced since 1985 by the companies Tesla Piešťany and Tesla Bratislava in the former Czechoslovakia.

The production was local, due to a lack of foreign currency for purchasing systems from the West. 

They were deployed en masse in schools throughout Slovakia, while the IQ 151 performed a similar role in the Czech part of the country. The first Czechoslovak video games were created on the PMD 85 (other platforms were ZX Spectrum and Atari).

Several variants were developed (PDM 85-0, PDM 85, PDM 85-2, PDM 85-2A, PDM 85-3), with slightly different specifications and compatibility.

In 1986 compatible machines were introduced by Didaktik: Didaktik Alfa 1 (a PMD 85-1 clone) and Didaktik Alfa 2 ( a PMD 85-2 clone). Didaktik Beta was a slightly improved Didaktik Alfa, having almost identical hardware. Didaktik Alfa and Beta were mostly deployed in schools to replace older PMD 85 computers.

After the Velvet Revolution of 1989 the computer market opened. The PDM 85 was not competitive in terms of quality or features to foreign machines and production stopped.

The PMD 85-2 was an inspiration for the MAŤO personal computer, released in 1989 as a self-assembly kit. It had different hardware and very limited compatibility - BASIC, memory structure and I/O were almost similar, but the tape format was different. It was intended as a home computer, but never really caught on. 

The same year ZBA, a company from Brno, introduced the Consul 2717, another PMD 85-2 clone, sold to schools. Production of this machined ended in 1990.

Variants

 The PMD 85-0, a prototype produced by Tesla Piešťany (author was Roman Kišš), was originally in a white-coloured case and later in some other colours. It is quite rare today.
 The PMD 85, produced by Tesla Piešťany since 1985, was known as the PMD 85 or PMD 85-1. It was made with a dark gray case, and was known for its keyboards with extremely tough keys. Alphanumeric keys were evaluated at the moment of a key release.
 The PMD 85-2, produced by Tesla Piešťany since 1986, introduced some improvements in BASIC, some in input routines (for instance, key autorepeat), a more ergonomic keyboard (but less mechanically reliable) and also terminal mode. Some of the changes caused it to be not completely backward compatible.
 The PMD 85-2A, produced by Tesla Bratislava since 1987, used 64 Kib RAM chips instead of 48 Kib, leading to less overheating of the memory chips, resulting in more memory available for BASIC, but was otherwise compatible with PMD 85-2.
 The PMD 85-3, produced by Tesla Bratislava since 1988, added colour TV output. Character encoding included all Czech and Slovak characters, and a Cyrillic version was also produced. System memory was enlarged to 8 KiB and monitor included routines for communication with PMD 32 floppy disk assembly, a ROM integrity test and also "PMD 85-2 compatibility mode" by relocation.

Specifications 
 MHB8080A 2.048MHz CPU (clone of Intel 8080)
 48 KiB RAM (64 KiB for PMD 85-2A and PMD 85-3 )
 4 KiB ROM (8 KiB for PMD 85-3)
 System monitor
 Tape utilities
 B/W TV output (PAL for the PMD 85-3) or RGB component video
 288×256 resolution
 4-level attribute (Black, White, Grey, Blink) selectable per 6-pixel-wide area (8 colors for the PMD-85-3)
 Tape recorder interface
 IRPS interface (passive current loop RS-232 without modem control signals)
 Module interface. A ROM module with the BASIC programming language was a standard part of the computer, but there were more ROM modules containing Pascal, Assembler, LOGO etc. A programmer was also available.
 IMS-2 interface (non-standard connector and electrically partially non-conforming) based on MHB8255A
 Two 8-bit parallel buses supporting handshaking (via second MHB8255A)
 Application connector (de facto system I/O bus)

See also
 MAŤO
 Tesla (Czechoslovak company)
 IQ 151
 Didaktik

References

External links
 Tesla PMD-85 Infoserver - Emulator PMD 85 and its clones for Windows
 DJ Martin Schotek's page
 DIY schematic and description

Computer-related introductions in 1985
Home computers
Science and technology in Czechoslovakia